Henry Thomas Venner (1923 – 12 April 2015), was a male international table tennis player from England.

Table tennis career
Venner won three medals at the World Table Tennis Championships in the Swaythling Cup (men's team) event.

He was an all-out attacking player and used a hard rubber bat for the majority of his career before switching to a sandwich bat. He later became a coach and ran the Putney Club. He died on 12 April 2015.

See also
 List of England players at the World Team Table Tennis Championships
 List of World Table Tennis Championships medalists

References

English male table tennis players
1923 births
2015 deaths
World Table Tennis Championships medalists